Geese are an American rock band based in Brooklyn, New York. The band is composed of Dominic DiGesu, Cameron Winter, Max Bassin, Gus Green and Foster Hudson.

History

Formation and early years 
The band formed in 2016 while the members were attending Brooklyn Friends School and Little Red School House in New York City. During high school, the band practiced and recorded material in the basement of Bassin's home in Fort Greene. 

As a few of the members had received acceptance letters to attend schools such as Oberlin College and the Berklee College of Music, the band had intended to break up once they graduated high school in 2020. Towards mid-2020, however, the band's self-produced demos attracted attention from several record labels, including 4AD, Fat Possum, and Sub Pop. Ultimately, the band signed with Partisan Records.

Projector (2021–present) 
The band released their debut album, Projector on October 29, 2021. It was recorded by the band in Bassin's basement from late 2019 to early 2020, and mixed by Dan Carey. The album was met with some critical acclaim, obtaining a Metacritic average of 83 out of 100 based on eight critic reviews. The album had three singles released ahead of the release: "Disco", "Low Era", and "Projector".

Influences 
The band's sound has been compared to a wide array of other New York bands, as well as contemporary British groups such as Black Midi and Squid. 

Writing for Rolling Stone magazine, Jon Dolan compared their works to numerous bands such as Parquet Courts, Deerhoof, Black Midi, Radiohead, The Strokes, Arctic Monkeys, LCD Soundsystem, The Feelies, and Echo and the Bunnymen, claiming that "you can hear NYC guitar zone-out Zen masters like Television, the Feelies, and Parquet Courts; the early-’00s neo-new wave and dance-punk of The Strokes, The Rapture, and LCD Soundsystem; scads of art-spaz stuff from DNA to Deerhoof to Black Midi; and even a flash of prog touchstones like Yes and Radiohead."

Describing the vocals of Cameron Winter, Dolan said that Winter "can hoist his voice into a Thom Yorke-an falsetto, put on a posh pout à la Julian Casablancas or Ian McCulloch of Echo and the Bunnymen, or lapse into a stentorian yawp that brings to mind Mark E. Smith of the Fall or Arctic Monkeys’ Alex Turner. Sometimes you can hear it all cross-pollinating within the space of the same three-minute song, making for an album that rewards both short attention spans and deep listening. It's a real treat to hear them zip between sonic epiphanies."

Discography

Studio albums 
 Projector  (2021)

Singles 
 "Cowboy Nudes" (2023)
 "Disco" (2021)
 "Low Era" (2021)
 "Projector" (2021)

Members 
 Cameron Winter (vocals, keyboards)
 Gus Green (guitar)
 Foster Hudson (guitar)
 Dominic DiGesu (bass)
 Max Bassin (drums)

References 

2016 establishments in New York City
Indie rock musical groups from New York (state)
Musical groups from New York City
American post-punk music groups
Musical groups established in 2018
Partisan Records artists
Musical quintets